Mark Pieloch is the President and owner of PF Inc., formerly known as Pet Flavors.

Education

Mark Pieloch attended Gardner High School in Gardner, Massachusetts. After high school, Pieloch earned a M.S. in Industrial Pharmacy from the Massachusetts College of Pharmacy, and went on to earn a Master of Business Administration from the Ross School of Business of the University of Michigan.

Career

Pieloch has been a Registered Pharmacist in Massachusetts since 1979. He has founded a variety of business in the field of pet pharmaceuticals.

Pharma Chemie, Inc

Pieloch founded Pharma Chemie, Inc. in Lincoln, Nebraska in 1990. In 1994 relocated the company to Syracuse, Nebraska. In 2012, he split Pharma Chemie, Inc. into two companies: Pharma Chemie, which remained in Syracuse and PSPC Inc. (later renamed Phycox) located in Melbourne, Florida. In 2012, Pieloch sold Pharma Chemie, Inc. to Pet Tech Labs.

Peak Nutrituion Inc.

In 1996, Pieloch founded Peak Nutrition Inc. He later sold the company in 2009.

PalaTech Laboratories

Pieloch incorporated PalaTech Laboratories in Nebraska in 1998, and sold the company in 2009.

Pet Flavors

Pieloch founded Pet Flavors in Dakota Dunes, South Dakota. In 2011, Pieloch then moved Pet Flavors Inc. to Melbourne, Florida. and renamed the company PF Inc.

FlavorTek Inc

In 2006, Pieloch founded FlavorTek Inc. in Oldsmar, Florida in 2006 and sold the company in 2010.

Phycox Canine Soft Chews

Pieloch founded Phycox Canine Soft Chews in 2008.

Patents

Mark Pieloch is named as an inventor or co-inventor on two patents. These are US patent #6780437, issued for coated potassium chloride granules and tablets, and US patent #7025965, issued for a method of use and dosage composition of bluegreen algae extract for inflammation in animals.

References

1957 births
American pharmacists
Ross School of Business alumni
Living people
People from Syracuse, Nebraska
MCPHS University alumni
People from Gardner, Massachusetts